The 2012 Northern Arizona Lumberjacks football team represented Northern Arizona University in the 2012 NCAA Division I FCS football season. They were led by 15th-year head coach Jerome Souers and played their home games at the Walkup Skydome. They are a member of the Big Sky Conference. They finished the season 8–3, 6–2 in the Big Sky to finish in fourth place.

Schedule

Game summaries

@ Arizona State

@ UNLV

Fort Lewis

@ Montana

Portland State

@ North Dakota

UC Davis

@ Northern Colorado

@ Idaho State

Southern Utah

Cal Poly

References

Northern Arizona
Northern Arizona Lumberjacks football seasons
Northern Arizona Lumberjacks football